Hikone may also refer to:

 Hikone, Shiga, is a city located in Shiga Prefecture, Japan.
 Hikone Domain, was a feudal domain of Japan during the Edo period.